Rhenefictus is a monotypic genus of southeast Asian jumping spiders containing the single species, Rhenefictus tropicus. It was first described by Dmitri V. Logunov in 2021, and it has only been found in Vietnam.

See also
 List of Salticidae genera

References

Monotypic Salticidae genera
Arthropods of Vietnam